Anthea Turner (born 25 May 1960) is an English television presenter. She was a host of Blue Peter from 1992 until 1994, and of GMTV from 1994 until 1996.

Early life
Turner was born in Stoke-on-Trent, Staffordshire, and educated at the Roman Catholic girls' school St Dominic's Grammar School in Stoke. She was one of three daughters born to her parents Brian and Jean Turner. One of her sisters, Ruth, died aged 15. Her other sister is presenter Wendy Turner Webster.

Career
Turner joined BBC Radio Stoke as a runner, eventually joining breakfast show presenter Bruno Brookes as part of his rap crew. The couple became romantically involved and employed Peter Powell as an agent through his management company.

Television
Turner moved into television through Sky Channel and Music Box presenting live music programmes from July 1986 to 1989. Her debut on national television was with the BBC on But First This, which led to her fronting two series for the BBC on the Saturday morning show UP2U.

During a motorbike stunt that went wrong on UP2U, Turner suffered burns and temporary hearing loss, which led to a successful lawsuit against the BBC.

She presented Top of the Pops from October 1988 to May 1991, and, for the final 18 months of this period, was the only non-Radio 1 DJ to do so regularly.

Turner presented the children's television show Blue Peter from 27 June 1992 to 29 June 1994, and around this time was also associated with publicising The Y Plan, a system of exercise developed by the London YMCA. She moved on to presenting on Totally Live on pan-European music channel Music Box, followed by GMTV, which she presented from July 1994 to 24 December 1996.

Turner was also a host on the first National Lottery draw on BBC One on 19 November 1994 with Noel Edmonds and Gordon Kennedy. She remained as sole host of the National Lottery Live until 20 April 1996, when she joined ITV and the travel show Wish You Were Here...?, becoming the second-highest-paid female television presenter in the UK, after Cilla Black. She was replaced on The National Lottery Live by Bob Monkhouse.

The relationship between Turner and her GMTV co-presenter Eamonn Holmes was frosty, with Holmes issuing an ultimatum to the GMTV management that he would leave if they did not sack his colleague: as a result, Turner lost her job. After Bovey left his wife Della for Turner, with ensuing tabloid interest, Turner's career went into a decline. Her autobiography Fools Rush In, for which she was paid an estimated £400,000 advance, sold 451 copies in its first week of release in November 2000 and entered the bestseller charts at No. 531.

Attempting to revive her career, Turner presented BBC One's short-lived Saturday-evening programme Your Kids Are in Charge in 2000 with her sister Wendy Turner Webster. The following year, she participated in Celebrity Big Brother, and was the third contestant to be evicted, after Chris Eubank and Vanessa Feltz.

In February 2006, Turner made a television comeback on BBC Three in Anthea Turner: Perfect Housewife, where she taught disorganised-house women and men how to clean and run their houses. The series was accompanied by three related books. Later in 2006, she appeared as a guest on BBC Two's music-based panel show Never Mind the Buzzcocks.

In April 2009, Turner appeared on the ITV reality show Hell's Kitchen with Marco Pierre White, alongside her then husband Grant Bovey. Turner also presented the show Help Me Anthea, I'm Infested for BBC Three, as she advised people whose homes have been overrun by pests. Turner took part in the first series of the Channel 4 game show The Jump in 2013. The show saw twelve celebrities take part in winter sports. The show is set in a mountainside in Austria.

On 23 August 2015, she replaced Anne Diamond and Sian Welby as the host of the Health Lottery draws on Channel 5. Welby later returned on 2 October and Anthea Turner was dropped from the line-up.

Turner took part in a special celebrity edition of Channel 4's First Dates on 12 October 2015, in aid of Stand Up to Cancer.

On 20 November 2017, Turner appeared on the BBC show Celebrity Antiques Road Trip in an episode set in Staffordshire and Cheshire. In 2018, she appeared on the Channel 5 show Celebs In Solitary, where she attempted to spend five days in solitary confinement.

Dancing on Ice

In 2013, Turner appeared as a contestant in the eighth series of Dancing on Ice, where she finished in ninth place out of twelve celebrity skaters. She participated in the show with her professional skating partner Andrew Buchanan. In the third week she performed to the Donny Osmond song "Puppy Love", and ended up in the skate-off against Keith Chegwin. They lost the skate-off and were the fourth couple to be eliminated in the series.

Note: Week 3 was a duel, in which the judges did not give scores, instead the celebrities were paired up and the judges chose which performance they preferred, making them immune from the public vote.

Twitter controversy
In February 2021 she was criticised for tweets by many on Twitter. The first tweet showed two women, one without a mask and a second woman in a wheelchair wearing a mask holding a McDonald’s takeaway bag. A speech bubble attributes the words "Put a mask on! You’re putting my health at risk!" to the second woman. In a second tweet she said "Sadly those of us who have genuinely tried to protect the NHS by looking after our bodies are paying the terrible price for those who have chosen lazy lifestyle choices." Piers Morgan called one tweet "despicable", adding "What the hell is this? Have you lost your mind, Anthea?". He criticised the second tweet by saying "You’re blaming 120,000+ covid deaths on the victims being lazy? What a repellent, dumb and grotesquely offensive attitude. Shame on you." Jess Phillips commented "The Anthea Turner thing this morning has just about done me in. I just wish the idiots would just admit that the wind on their face is more important than my sister in laws life while she has chemo. Stop with the god damn hierarchy of whose life matters."

Personal life
Turner's private life has been covered in the tabloid press. The then-editor of the Daily Mirror, Piers Morgan, admitted in April 2003 that the interest of the popular press in Turner's private life had seriously damaged her career.

After her long relationship with one-time DJ co-worker Bruno Brookes, she married her manager, former DJ Peter Powell in 1990; the couple divorced in 1998.

The year of her divorce from Powell, Turner moved in with the CEO of Imagine Homes, Grant Bovey. Bovey left his wife, Della, to move in with Turner. He later reconciled with Della, before leaving her again to return to Turner. Turner and Bovey married on 23 August 2000. Turner was keen to start her own family with Bovey, who has three daughters from his previous marriage.

OK! magazine was sold exclusive rights to the Bovey-Turner wedding for an amount that Turner described as "substantial".. The only photograph released to the media was of Bovey and Turner biting into a Cadbury Snowflake chocolate bar, which had been provided by the magazine.

Several tabloids ran critical stories, but Turner wrote in her autobiography that she believed that the photo that would be released to the media would be a "traditional wedding-day shot" and OK! confirmed that neither Turner nor Bovey had been involved in the picture's release.

Turner further wrote "The whole thing smacked of us selling our souls for sponsorship, which could not have been further from the truth. We'd never entered into any discussion or financial agreement with the chocolate company: our only link with them had been the box of confectionary that they had sent for the reception. Indeed, the whole concept was absolutely abhorrent to us both. To say I was gutted would be a gross understatement. It just goes to show that even the most experienced of us can be lulled into a false sense of security and caught off guard."
	
Turner and Bovey split up in 2012, due to Bovey's extramarital affair. After an initial reconciliation, they separated again in August 2013, this time permanently and they divorced in October 2015.

Books
Underneath the Underground: The Ghost of Knightsbridge (1998) – with Wendy Turner Webster
Fools Rush In (2000)
How to Be the Perfect Housewife: Lessons in the Art of Modern Household Management (2007)
How to Be the Perfect Housewife: Entertain in Style (2008)
The Perfect Christmas (2008)

Appearances
Television

Guest appearances
The Lily Savage Show (1998)
Loose Women (1999, 2000, 2003, 2008, 2016)
Never Mind the Buzzcocks (2006)
The Wright Stuff (2006, 2007, 2008, 2013, 2014, 2015, 2016)
The Alan Titchmarsh Show (2008)
Hell's Kitchen (2009)
The Gadget Show (2009)
All Star Family Fortunes (2009)
Let's Dance for Sport Relief (2009)
All Star Mr & Mrs (2010)
Pointless Celebrities (2012, 2014, 2015)
10 O'Clock Live (2012)
Daybreak (2012)
This Morning (2013)
Sky News (2013, 2014, 2015, 2016) 
Who's Doing the Dishes? (2015)
Celebrity First Dates (2015)
Through the Key Hole (2015, 2017)
Celebrity Antiques Road Trip (2017)
8 Out of 10 Cats Does Countdown (2019)

References

External links

Official website

1960 births
Blue Peter presenters
GMTV presenters and reporters
English television presenters
Living people
People from Stoke-on-Trent
People educated at St Dominic's Grammar School
Top of the Pops presenters